Sangro River War Cemetery is a British and Commonwealth war cemetery sited by a hillside near Torino di Sangro in the Province of Chieti, Italy.

In this cemetery are buried 2,542 soldiers from the United Kingdom and the British Commonwealth who died in World War II defending the shoreline near the Sangro River against the retreating German soldiers on the Winter Line.

Within the cemetery is the Sangro River Cremation Memorial, which commemorates 517 Indian soldiers cremated in accordance with their faith.
The marble gravestones are arranged in such a way as to form a kind of amphitheatre.

A path follows a row of magnolias to the Croce del Sacrificio ("Cross of Sacrifice"). Another path follows a hawthorn hedge to the Porta della Rimembranza ("Door of Remembrance").

The numbers of burials are as follows:

 United Kingdom: 1,768
 Canada: 2
 Australia: 3
 New Zealand: 355
 South Africa: 74
 India: 335
 Other states: 5
 Unknown soldiers: 75

Amongst the burials lies Major John Thompson McKellar Anderson (1918–1943) who received the Victoria Cross for action at Longstop Hill, Tunisia, in April 1943.

References

External links
 
 Torino di Sangro commune website 

World War II cemeteries in Italy
Commonwealth War Graves Commission cemeteries in Italy
Buildings and structures in the Province of Chieti